Bruno Eliasen (11 July 1933 – 11 September 1995) was a Danish footballer. He played in three matches for the Denmark national football team from 1958 to 1963.

References

External links
 
 

1933 births
1995 deaths
Danish men's footballers
Denmark international footballers
Footballers from Odense
Association football midfielders
Boldklubben 1909 players